The Cooper bomb was a British 20 pound bomb used extensively in World War I, it was the first high explosive bomb to be adapted by the Royal Flying Corps.

Design 

List of aircraft that used the Cooper bomb 
 Royal Aircraft Factory S.E.5
 Bristol F.2 Fighter
 Airco DH.4
 Sopwith Camel
 Royal Aircraft Factory F.E.2

References 

Aerial bombs of the United Kingdom
World War I weapons of the United Kingdom